Eric Bagger (born Nylander; 19 May 1955 in Örnsköldsvik, Sweden) is a Swedish writer, journalist and principal.

Bibliography 
 Linnés vän Peter Artedi 1705–1735, Jubileumsskrift utgiven av Projekt Vision Artedi och Kulturföreningen Anundsjö Ton (2005) Eric Nylander and Bo R Holmberg.
 Vandrare i Vändåt, Visto förlag (2014)
 Lägereld - en faktaroman, Visto förlag (2018)

References

1955 births
Living people
Swedish male writers
21st-century Swedish writers